Callipta is a genus of leaf beetles in the subfamily Eumolpinae. It contains four species, which are distributed in the Caucasus, Central to East Asia and North Africa. The genus was originally named Calliope by Julius Weise in 1882; however, as Édouard Lefèvre pointed out, the name "Calliope" had been used a number of times for genera described previously (for instance, the passerine bird genus Calliope Gould, 1836), so it was renamed to Callipta by Lefèvre in 1885.

Species
 Callipta borealis Lopatin, 1976 – Uzbekistan, China (Xinjiang)
 Callipta fausti (Weise, 1882)
 Callipta fausti badghyza Lopatin, 1997 – Turkmenistan (South Turkmenistan: Badkhyz)
 Callipta fausti balchana Lopatin, 1997 – Turkmenistan (West Turkmenistan)
 Callipta fausti fausti (Weise, 1882) – Azerbaijan, southern European Russia
 Callipta fausti murgabica Lopatin, 1997 – Turkmenistan (South Turkmenistan: Murgab River)
 Callipta fausti palvanica Lopatin, 1997 – Turkmenistan (North Turkmenistan: Kaplankyr)
 Callipta fausti turkomana Medvedev, 1957 – Turkmenistan (Kopet-Dag mountain ridge)
 Callipta iranica Lopatin, 1997 – Iran
 Callipta oberthuri (Fairmaire, 1876) – Algeria, Tunesia

References

Eumolpinae
Chrysomelidae genera
Beetles of North Africa
Beetles of Asia
Taxa named by Édouard Lefèvre